Jerzy Kopański (born 8 April 1957) is a Polish wrestler. He competed in the men's Greco-Roman 68 kg at the 1988 Summer Olympics.

References

1957 births
Living people
Polish male sport wrestlers
Olympic wrestlers of Poland
Wrestlers at the 1988 Summer Olympics
Sportspeople from Katowice